Jordan Rapana (born 15 August 1990) is a professional rugby league footballer who plays as a er for the Canberra Raiders in the NRL. He has played for the New Zealand Māori, New Zealand and the Cook Islands at international level.

He previously played for the Gold Coast Titans and Canberra in the National Rugby League.

Background
Rapana was born in Wellington, New Zealand, and is of Māori, Cook Island and Italian descent. From the Ngāti Toa iwi (Māori tribe), he moved to the Gold Coast, Queensland, Australia as a 10-year-old.

He played his junior football for the Tugun Seahawks and attended Palm Beach Currumbin High School before being signed by the Gold Coast Titans.

Playing career

2008
In 2008, Rapana played for the Gold Coast Titans' NYC team. In Round 18 of the 2008 NRL season, he made his NRL debut for the Gold Coast Titans against the Sydney Roosters. At the end of 2008, he was named on the interchange bench in the 2008 NYC Team of the Year.

He also played for the New Zealand Māori rugby league team.

2009
In 2009, Rapana left the NRL to serve a two-year Mormon mission in England and Wales. During his time in England he played for Supermarine RFC.

2011
In June, Rapana signed a contract with Super Rugby team, Western Force, starting in 2012. For the 2012 season, he played for the Palmyra Rugby Union Club.

2013
In 2013, Rapana moved to Canberra to play for the Queanbeyan Blues in the TTM Canberra Raiders Cup and also to train with the Brumbies in the hope of gaining a contract. On 24 June, he signed a two-year contract with the Canberra Raiders effective immediately.

At the end of 2013, he played for the Cook Islands in the 2013 Rugby League World Cup.

2014
On 7 August, Rapana re-signed with the Canberra Raiders on a one-year contract. In Round 22 of the 2014 NRL season, he made his debut for the Canberra club against the Parramatta Eels, his first NRL game since 2008.

2015
On 8 May, Rapana re-signed with the Canberra Raiders on a two-year contract. On 17 October, he played for the Cook Islands in their Asia-Pacific Qualifier match against Tonga for the 2017 Rugby League World Cup.

2016
In Round 8 against the Wests Tigers, Rapana scored four tries in Canberra's 60–6 win at Canberra Raiders. He finished the 2016 season with 23 tries, equal most with Suliasi Vunivalu, and breaking the Canberra club record During the season, Rapana and his centre partner Joseph Leilua became one of the most destructive duos of the year, scoring some fantastic tries and their strong friendship outside the footy field labelling them as "Leipana". Rapana finished the 2016 NRL season as the season's equal top try-scorer with Melbourne Storm rookie Suliasi Vunivalu with 23 tries in 26 matches. Rapana broke Canberra's club record for the most tries in a season. On 4 October 2016, he was rewarded for his big year with Canberra by being selected in the New Zealand Kiwis 24-man squad for the 2016 Four Nations. On 15 October 2016, he made his international debut for the Kiwis against Australia, playing on the wing in the 26–6 loss at Perth Oval. In his next match against England, Rapana scored two tries in the 17–16 win at Kirklees Stadium in Huddersfield.

Rapana played in four matches and scored three tries in the tournament including playing in the Kiwis 2016 Four Nations final match against Australia, playing on the wing in the 34–8 loss at Anfield.

Rapana was named the Kiwis rookie of the year by the New Zealand Rugby League.

2017
After Canberra's season opening Round 1 match against the North Queensland Cowboys, Rapana received a warning from the NRL after he put up both of his middle fingers, gesturing at the officials after teammate Elliot Whitehead was denied a try in Golden Point Extra Time; the Raiders lost 20-16 shortly afterwards at 1300SMILES Stadium.

On 10 March 2019, Rapana signed a two-year extension with Canberra, keeping him in the nation's capital until 2019.

In Round 8 against the Manly-Warringah Sea Eagles, Rapana scored one of the season's best tries by leaping high and somehow getting a hand to a Blake Austin grubber that looked destined to go too deep in the corner during Canberra's 20-18 golden point extra time loss at Canberra Stadium.

On 5 May 2017, Rapana played for New Zealand in the 2017 ANZAC Test against Australia, playing on the wing in the 30–12 loss at Canberra Stadium. Rapana finished the 2017 NRL season as the club's highest try-scorer with 21 tries in 23 matches. On 5 October 2017, Rapana was named in the New Zealand Kiwis 24-man squad for the 2017 Rugby League World Cup. Rapana played in 3 matches and scored 2 tries in the Kiwis shock disappointing campaign.

2018
Rapana finished the 2018 NRL season by playing in 21 matches and scoring 10 tries for the Raiders. On 1 October 2018, he was selected in the Kiwis' 23-man squad for their tour of England and the test match against Australia.

In the second match in the Baskerville Shield against England, Rapana suffered a dislocated shoulder during the Kiwis 20–14 loss at Anfield. The injury was expected to sideline him for at least six months. The Raiders sought a salary cap exemption of up to $350,000, possible where a player suffers a long-term injury while on rep duty.

2019
Rapana made a shocking return for Canberra two months earlier than expected, slotting back into his wing spot in Round 2 against the Melbourne Storm in the 22–10 loss at Canberra Stadium. In Round 4 against the North Queensland Cowboys, he played his 100th NRL career match and scored two tries in the 30–12 win at 1300SMILES Stadium.

Rapana made 21 appearances for Canberra as the club reached their first grand final in 25 years, playing on the wing as Canberra were defeated 14-8 by the Sydney Roosters at ANZ Stadium.

In October 2019, Rapana announced that he had signed a one-year deal to join Japanese rugby union team the Panasonic Wild Knights. On 30 October, the NRL announced that Rapana would not be allowed to return to Canberra during the 2020 season. However, that decision was overturned when he returned to the Raiders in May 2020 following the suspension of the Japanese rugby season due to COVID-19.

2020
Rapana played 19 games for Canberra in the 2020 NRL season and scored only two tries.  He played in all three of Canberra's finals matches including the preliminary final loss to Melbourne.

2021
In round 1 of the 2021 NRL season, he scored two tries in a 30-12 victory over Wests Tigers.

In round 7, he scored two tries in a 26-24 loss against North Queensland.
In round 8 against South Sydney, he scored two tries and kicked two goals in a 34-20 loss at GIO Stadium.

Rapana played 22 games for Canberra in the 2021 NRL season and scored 12 tries in total.  Canberra would finish the season in 10th place and missed out on the finals.

On 27 September, Rapana was arrested by Queensland Police after failing a roadside breath test recording an blood alcohol limit of 0.098.  On 25 October, Rapana was handed a $500 fine and suspended from driving for three months at Maroochydore Magistrates Court.

2022

In round 18 of the 2022 NRL season, Rapana was sent to the sin bin for a dangerous high tackle during Canberra's 20-16 upset victory over Melbourne.

Rapana played a total of 21 games for Canberra in 2022 as the club finished 8th on the table and qualified for the finals.  Rapana played in both finals matches as Canberra were eliminated in the second week by Parramatta.

In October Rapana was named in the New Zealand squad for the 2021 Rugby League World Cup.

Statistics

References

External links

Canberra Raiders profile
Raiders profile
NRL profile
Rapana, Walker answer Titans' SOS call
Rapana to answer Titans' prayers
Rapana becomes youngest Titan
RLeague.com profile
Titans flyer leaves on a mission
Western Force Profile
2017 RLWC profile

1989 births
Living people
ACT Brumbies players
Australian people of Cook Island descent
Australian people of Māori descent
Canberra Raiders players
Cook Islands national rugby league team players
Gold Coast Titans players
Mount Pritchard Mounties players
New Zealand rugby league players
New Zealand rugby union players
New Zealand sportspeople of Cook Island descent
New Zealand Māori rugby league team players
New Zealand people of Italian descent
New Zealand emigrants to Australia
New Zealand national rugby league team players
New Zealand Latter Day Saints
Rugby league wingers
Rugby league fullbacks
Rugby league players from Wellington City
Rugby union players from Wellington City
Souths Logan Magpies players
Western Force players